Sir John Mordaunt, 5th Baronet (by 1649 – 6 September 1721) of Walton d'Eiville was an English Tory politician who sat in the English and British House of Commons from 1698 to 1715.

Mordaunt was the second son of Sir Charles Mordaunt, 3rd Baronet  and his wife Catherine Tollemache, daughter of Sir Lionel Tollemache, 2nd Baronet, of Helmingham, Suffolk. He succeeded his elder brother to the baronetcy on 24 April 1665 and inherited the Massingham Estate at Little Massingham, Norfolk. Mordaunt was one of  Warwickshire's two deputy-lieutenants and following the Rye House Plot was involved in organising arms searches in Warwickshire's main towns in 1683. 

He married by licence dated 13 June 1678, aged 21, Anne Risley, daughter of William Risley of the Friary, Bedford. She died in 1692 and he married as his second wife, by licence dated  8 June 1695, Penelope Warburton, the daughter of Sir George Warburton, 3rd Baronet, of Arley, Cheshire.

Mordaunt was returned as Member of Parliament for Warwickshire at the 1698 English general election. He held the seat until 1715.

Mordaunt died  at Kensington on 6 September 1721.

References

 

Year of birth uncertain
17th-century births
1721 deaths
Mordaunt baronets
English MPs 1698–1700
English MPs 1701
English MPs 1701–1702
English MPs 1702–1705
English MPs 1705–1707
Members of the Parliament of Great Britain for English constituencies
British MPs 1707–1708
British MPs 1708–1710
British MPs 1710–1713
British MPs 1713–1715
Tory members of the Parliament of Great Britain